In a system of free-market healthcare, prices for healthcare goods and services are set freely by agreement between patients and health care providers, and the laws and forces of supply and demand are free from any intervention by a government, price-setting monopoly, or other authority. A free market contrasts with a controlled market, in which government intervenes in supply and demand through non-market methods such as laws creating barriers or incentives to market entry, or through directly setting prices.

Advocates of free-market healthcare contend that systems like single-payer healthcare and publicly funded healthcare result in higher costs, inefficiency, longer waiting times for care, denial of care to some, and overall mismanagement.

Opponents argue that healthcare as an unregulated commodity invokes market failures not present with government regulation and that selling healthcare as a commodity leads to both unfair and inefficient systems, with poorer individuals being unable to afford preventive care.

References 

Free market
Healthcare reform in the United States
Health economics
Libertarian theory